The 1932 Rose Bowl was the 18th Rose Bowl game, an American post-season college football game that was played on New Year's Day 1932 in Pasadena, California. It featured the Tulane Green Wave against the USC Trojans. The Trojans had six All-Americans in their lineup: tackle Ernie Smith, guards Johnny Baker and Aaron "Rosy" Rosenberg, halfback Erny Pinckert and quarterbacks Orville Mohler and Gaius Shaver.

Background
Tulane won all eleven games of the regular season, shutting their opponents out seven times while allowing just 35 total points on the season to win the Southern Conference for the third straight year. Captain for the team was Jerry Dalrymple, the only unanimous All-American in the country that year.

USC started their season with a loss to Saint Mary's in Los Angeles. However, they won the next nine games to prevail as champions of the Pacific Coast Conference for the fourth time in five seasons, having six shutouts (notably scoring 69 on Montana and 60 on Georgia).

Scoring

Second Quarter
USC – Ray Sparling, 5-yard run (Baker kick good) 9:34 7-0 USC

Third Quarter
USC – Erny Pinckert, 30-yard run (Baker kick good) 12:26 14-0 USC
USC – Erny Pinckert, 23-yard run (Baker kick good) 8:32 21-0 USC
Tul – Haynes, 15-yard pass from Don Zimmerman (Don Zimmerman kick failed) 2:56 21-6 USC

Fourth Quarter
Tul – Wop Glover, 2-yard run (Point after failed) 9:34 21-12 USC

Game notes
To protect his kidney injury, Tulane captain Jerry Dalrymple wore a special pad during the game. It was reported that USC captain Stan Williamson told the referee to allow Dalrymple as much time as he needed to adjust the pad during a timeout in the name of sportsmanship.

References

Rose Bowl
Rose Bowl Game
Tulane Green Wave football bowl games
USC Trojans football bowl games
1932 in sports in California
January 1932 sports events